The presence of Tunisians in Italy dates back to the 1980s.

Numbers
In 2014 in Italy there are 96,012 regular immigrants from Tunisia. In 2006 there were 88,932. The three cities with most number of Tunisians are: Rome, Mazara del Vallo and Vittoria.

Notable Tunisians in Italy

 Afef Jnifen (1963), model
 Ghali (1993), rapper

See also
Arabs in Europe
Arabs in Italy
Egyptians in Italy
Moroccans in Italy
Algerians in Italy
Italian Tunisians

References

African diaspora in Italy
Ethnic groups in Italy
Muslim communities in Europe
Italy–Tunisia relations